Margaret de Beaumont, 7th Countess of Warwick or Margaret de Neubourg or Margery de Newburgh (died 3 June 1253) was the daughter of Henry de Beaumont, 5th Earl of Warwick and Margaret D'Oyly. She was the sister and heiress of Thomas de Beaumont, 6th Earl of Warwick and became the 7th Countess of Warwick in her own right. She married firstly John Marshal (died October 1242) and, secondly, John de Plessis. The latter was a great favourite of King Henry III of England who, in 1247, created him the 7th Earl of Warwick and subsequently Count of Warwick.  He died on 20 February 1263. There was no issue by either of these marriages and so, at Margaret's death, the estates passed to her cousin, William Mauduit, who became the 8th Earl.

References

Earls of Warwick (1088 creation)
Warwick, Margaret de Newburg, Countess of
Warwick, Margaret de Newburg, Countess of
1253 deaths
Margaret
Year of birth unknown
13th-century English nobility
13th-century English women
13th-century English landowners
13th-century women landowners